Elephanta Island (also called Gharapuri (literally "the city of caves") or Pory Island) is one of a number of islands in Mumbai Harbour, east of Mumbai, India.

Tourist attractions and accessibility

This island is a popular tourist destination because of the island's cave temples, the Elephanta Caves, that have been carved out of rock.

Boats leave daily from the Gateway of India, taking about an hour each way. The tickets for these can be bought at the Gateway itself. The first ferry leaves at 9 am and the last at 2 pm. From the boat landing stage on the island, a walkway leads to steps that go up to the famous caves.

There is also a narrow-gauge toy train from the boat area on the dock to the base of the steps leading up to the caves (about 600 meters). Along the path, hawkers sell souvenirs like necklaces, anklets, showpieces and keychains. There are also stalls to buy food and drinks. Small monkeys play along the sides of the path, occasionally thieving items from the hawkers, trashcans and tourists.

Mumbai Port Trust (MbPT) has plans to connect the island from Haji Bunder, Mumbai via Ropeway. Once built, it will take only 14 minutes to reach the UNESCO World Heritage Site whereas currently ferry takes about an hour.

History
Known in ancient times as Gharapuri (or, 'place of caves'), the name Elephanta island, was given by 16th-century Portuguese explorers, after seeing a monolithic basalt sculpture of an elephant found near the entrance. They decided to take it home but ended up dropping it into the sea because their chains were not strong enough. Later, this sculpture was moved to the Victoria gardens and then the Victoria and Albert Museum (now Dr. Bhau Daji Lad Museum) in Mumbai, by the British. This island was once the capital of a powerful local kingdom.
In Manuscript F by Leonardo da Vinci (kept at the Library de France) there is a note in which he says "Map of Elephanta in India which Antonello the haberdasher has."  It is unclear who this Florentine traveller Antonello might have been.

Orientation
The area comes under the jurisdiction of the Raigad district in Maharashtra.

Agricultural makeup
The island is thickly wooded with palm, mango, and tamarind trees.

Inhabitants
It has a population of about 1,200 people. The inhabitants are mainly involved in growing rice, fishing and repairing boats. There are two British-era cannons at the top. Quite recently, a small dam has been built so as to hold rainwater but that part of the island is privately owned and not accessible for tourists.

There are a total of three villages: Shentbandar, Morabandar and Rajbandar, of which Rajbandar is the capital.  Caves and stalls can be seen in Shentbandar which is the first village accessed by tourists when they arrive on the island. Morabandar is covered with thick forest. Staying overnight after sunset on the island is not permitted for tourists as they are expected to leave before the departure of the last return ferry. The first return ferry leaves at 12:30 p.m. and the last return ferry leaves at 6:30 p.m. The ferry service is closed in the monsoon season for four months due to torrential rains at the sea.

Gallery

References

External links

 Elephanta
 Elephanta caves
 UNESCO World Heritage Site 
 Going’s tough at Gharapuri  
 Duffer's Guide to Elephanta, Mid-Day, 22 February 2007, pg A14

Geography of Raigad district
Islands of Mumbai
Tourist attractions in Raigad district
Islands of India
Populated places in India